Hulung is an extinct Austronesian language of Seram in the Maluku archipelago of Indonesia.

References

Languages of Indonesia
Seram Island
Extinct languages of Oceania
Central Malayo-Polynesian languages
Languages extinct in the 2000s